The Laurel-Hardy Murder Case is a Laurel and Hardy pre-Code comedy film released in 1930. It is one of a handful of three-reel comedies they made, running 28 minutes. It was directed by James Parrott, produced by Hal Roach and distributed by MGM.

Plot 
Laurel and Hardy are seated at a dockside where Stan is fishing. Ollie sees a notice in a newspaper which says one Ebeneezer Laurel has died and left a large estate. Parties interested in the estate should go to the Laurel mansion for the reading of the will. Stan can't remember if Ebeneezer is a relative or not but they decide to go to the mansion anyway. They arrive during a thunderstorm and discover that Ebeneezer had been murdered and that the police had placed the notice in the newspaper to draw all of the relatives together to find out who committed the crime.

Stan and Ollie are shown to a bedroom to sleep overnight, which is the room in which Ebeneezer was murdered. They hear a strange noise and in the darkness see a pair of eyes which turns out to be a cat. They then hear a scream and decide to investigate.

Meanwhile, the butler is calling all of the relatives one by one to the study telling them they have a telephone call. As each relative sits in a chair and lifts the receiver, the lights go out, there is a scream and a sound like a door slamming; and the relative is never seen again. Stan and Ollie return to their bedroom and get into the bed but a bat has flown into their room and is under their covers, which causes them to panic and run downstairs.

All of the other relatives have now disappeared and the butler calls Stan and Ollie to take a telephone call in the study. Ollie sits in the chair to take the call; this time, however, the lights stay on and it is revealed that the chair is affixed to a trapdoor into which each of the other relatives vanished. Ollie falls through the trapdoor, but is saved due to his having become wedged in the chair. The murderer (a man dressed in drag) appears through a secret door with a knife. A fight ensues, but then Stan and Ollie both wake up from a dream, fighting over Stan's fishing line at the dockside and then falling into the water.

Cast

Cultural significance 
This is the first film where Oliver says "Here's another nice mess you've gotten me into". The phrase is commonly misquoted as "Here's another fine mess you've gotten me into" and has passed into everyday usage.

This first episode for the 1930–31 season had orchestral music scoring in places and no background music in others. Leroy Shield tunes by now were featured in Hal Roach's Our Gang, and were tried in a few previous Laurel and Hardy films. These tunes would be featured from this time on, beginning with their next episode Another Fine Mess.

Influences and title 
 The film is a parody of the silent horror film The Cat and the Canary (1927).
 The film is also a parody of a silent film called The Bat (1926).
 The film name may be a play on words from the film The Canary Murder Case (1929), and other titles based on Philo Vance mystery novels, although the films' plots are totally different. The dash in place of an ampersand may also indicate that the title derives from the Hall-Mills murder case, a high-profile New Jersey murder trial that dominated newspaper front pages throughout much of 1926.
 The 1943 Metro-Goldwyn-Mayer animated short directed by Tex Avery, Who Killed Who?, borrowed imagery, characters and situations from the film.
 If a Body Meets a Body (1945) with The Three Stooges has a similar plot, and also features actor Fred Kelsey.
 The opening title says that "Mr. Laurel and Mr. Hardy had been looking for work since 1921" which was the date their first short film was made.

References

External links 
 
 
 
 

1930 films
1930 comedy films
1930s American films
1930s comedy horror films
1930s English-language films
American black-and-white films
American comedy horror films
Comedy mystery films
Films directed by James Parrott
Films scored by Nathaniel Shilkret
Films set in country houses
Films set in the United States
Films with screenplays by H. M. Walker
Laurel and Hardy (film series)
Metro-Goldwyn-Mayer short films
Parodies of horror